Port Ellen is a small town on the island of Islay, in Argyll, Scotland. The town is named after the wife of its founder, Walter Frederick Campbell. Its previous name, Leòdamas, is derived from Old Norse meaning "Leòd's Harbour".

Port Ellen is built around Leodamais Bay, Islay's main deep water harbour. It is the largest town on Islay, only slightly larger than Bowmore and provides the main ferry connection between Islay and the mainland, at Kennacraig. The Port Ellen Distillery was first established in the 1820s and ceased production of Scotch whisky in 1983. The large malting continues to produce for the majority of the distilleries on Islay.

History
The area around Port Ellen has a variety of archaeological sites covering the Neolithic, Bronze and Iron Age periods. There are standing stones at Kilbride, a fort at Borraichill Mor, several chambered cairns, and a chapel at Cill Tobar Lasrach. Nearby lie the ruined remains of the 14th-century Dunyvaig Castle, once a fortress of the MacDonald Lords of the Isles.

Ferry Service

Notable people
George Robertson, Baron Robertson of Port Ellen, Labour politician and former Secretary General of NATO was born in Port Ellen on 12 April 1946.

See also
St John's Church, Port Ellen

References

External links

Canmore - Islay, Port Ellen, General site record

 
Villages in Islay